Mikhail Andreyevich Kulagin (Russian: Михаил Андреевич Кулагин; born 4 August 1994) is a Russian professional basketball player for UNICS Kazan of the VTB United League. He is a 1.92 m (6' 3") tall point guard-shooting guard.

Professional career
After playing with the youth clubs of CSKA Moscow, Kulagin has played professionally with the Russian clubs Triumph Lyubertsy, Rossiya Novogorsk, and CSKA Moscow. After five seasons, he parted ways with CSKA Moscow on June 1, 2020. On August 19, 2020 Kulagin signed with BC Enisey.

On July 20, 2021, he has signed third time with Nizhny Novgorod of the VTB United League.

On June 29, 2022, he has signed with UNICS Kazan of the VTB United League.

National team career

Russian junior national team
Kulagin was a member of the junior national teams of Russia. With Russia's junior national teams, he played at the 2010 FIBA Europe Under-16 Championship, the 2012 FIBA Europe Under-18 Championship, where he was a member of the All-Tournament Team, the 2013 FIBA Under-19 World Championship, and the 2014 FIBA Europe Under-20 Championship.

Russian senior national team
Kulagin has been a member of the senior Russian national basketball team. With Russia, he played at the EuroBasket 2017.

Personal life
His older brother, Dmitry Kulagin, is also a professional basketball player.

References

External links
 Mikhail Kulagin at draftexpress.com
 Mikhail Kulagin at eurobasket.com
 Mikhail Kulagin at euroleague.net
 Mikhail Kulagin at fiba.com
 Mikhail Kulagin at fibaeurope.com

1994 births
Living people
2019 FIBA Basketball World Cup players
Basketball players from Moscow
BC UNICS players
BC Zenit Saint Petersburg players
PBC CSKA Moscow players
Point guards
Russian men's basketball players
Shooting guards